The following lists events that happened during 1864 in Chile.

Incumbents
President of Chile: José Joaquín Pérez

Events 
Chincha Islands War

Births

Deaths
20 January - José Francisco Gana (born 1791)

References 

 
1860s in Chile
Chile
Chile
Years of the 19th century in Chile